WDMX (100.1 FM, "Mix 100") is a classic hits formatted broadcast radio station licensed to Vienna, West Virginia, serving the Parkersburg/Marietta area.  WDMX is owned and operated by iHeartMedia, Inc.

External links
Mix 100 Online

DMX
IHeartMedia radio stations